OEV may refer to:

A location of Occupy Eugene
Abbreviation for L'Œuvre, a group in Architecture of Switzerland
Venezuelan Electoral Observatory, an observing group in the 2017 Venezuelan municipal elections
Opened-eye visuals, an effect of the street drug 2C-B
Operation Earnest Voice (OEV), a communications programme by the United States Central Command
Other Exempt Vehicles, a classification of vehicles for Vehicle registration plates of the Philippines
Optional Exchange Vehicle program for Armored Multi-Purpose Vehicle